The Women's Heptathlon event at the 2010 South American Games was held on March 20 and March 21.

Medalists

Records

Results
Results and intermediate results after 6 events were published.

100m Hurdles

High Jump

Shot Put

200m

Long Jump

Javelin Throw

800m

Final standing

See also
2010 South American Under-23 Championships in Athletics

References

External links
100m Hurdles 
High Jump 
Shot Put 
200m 
Long Jump 
Javelin Throw 
800m 
Final Standings

Heptathlon W